The  is a Shinto shrine and Buddhist Benten-dō located in the Showa ward of Nagoya, central Japan.

The construction date of the shrine is not clear, it is assumed however that is appeared around 1000. The shrine underwent a number of reconstructions and renovations, the last one being in 1998. There is a pond with turtles that surround the shrine.

Since Buddhism and Shinto were closely intertwined, the shrine was also dedicated to Benzaiten. Therefore, it is better known as the "Benten of Kawana" rather than "Kawahara Shrine".

The nearest Nagoya Municipal Bus stop is "Bentenmae" on the No. 18.

Shinto shrines in Nagoya